Facundo Castelli (born 18 February 1995) is an Argentine professional footballer who plays as a forward for Estudiantes de Buenos Aires, on loan from Deportivo Maipú.

Career
Castelli began with Instituto. He made the first three appearances of his career throughout the 2015 Primera B Nacional, in-between seasons where he didn't feature in the league though was on the substitutes bench twice. His first professional league appearance came on 7 March 2015 against Central Córdoba, but his senior bow arrived in the preceding July versus Arsenal de Sarandí in the Copa Argentina. Castelli netted his first goal in December 2016 in a win over Gimnasia y Esgrima. The 2017–18 season saw the forward score six goals in the league, which included braces over Estudiantes and Juventud Unida respectively.

Castelli spent 2019–20 out on loan with Sarmiento. Eleven appearances followed, prior to his return to his parent club. In March 2021, Castelli moved to Primera Nacional club Deportivo Maipú. In June 2022, Castelli joined Estudiantes de Buenos Aires on loan until 31 December 2023, free of charge and with a purchase option.

Career statistics
.

References

External links

1995 births
Living people
Sportspeople from Córdoba, Argentina
Argentine footballers
Association football forwards
Primera Nacional players
Instituto footballers
Club Atlético Sarmiento footballers
Deportivo Maipú players
Estudiantes de Buenos Aires footballers